The 17th BET Awards  was held at the Microsoft Theater in Los Angeles, California on June 25, 2017. The ceremony celebrated achievements in entertainment and honors music, sports, television, and movies released between April 1, 2016 and March 31, 2017. The nominations were announced on May 15, 2017; Beyoncé led the nominees with 7, followed by Bruno Mars with 5. Beyoncé won the most awards with 5, including Album of the Year and Video of the Year.

Performances

Presenters
 Solange
Yara Shahidi
Cardi B
Issa Rae
Jamie Foxx
Lil' Kim and Havoc (tribute to Prodigy)
La La Anthony
The Cast of Girls Trip (Regina Hall, Tiffany Haddish, with Jada Pinkett Smith and Queen Latifah)
Nomzamo Mbatha
Eva Marcille
Robin Thede
Trevor Noah
Demetrius Shipp Jr.
Logan Browning
Cari Champion
Deon Cole
Remy Ma
Irv Gotti
The Cast of Detroit (Algee Smith, Jason Mitchell, Laz Alonso and Jacob Latimore)
DeRay Davis
Karrueche Tran
 Too Short

Winners and nominations
Winners highlighted in Bold

Special awards
Lifetime Achievement Award: New Edition
Humanitarian Award: Chance the Rapper
Global Good Power Award: Yvonne Chaka Chaka

References

External links

BET Awards
2017 music awards
2017 awards
2017 awards in the United States